Péter Czvitkovics (born 10 February 1983) is a Hungarian footballer who plays for Hungarian amateur club Unione FC as a right winger. He is also the assistant coach of III. Kerületi TVE

Career
Ahead of the 2019/20 season, Czvitkovics joined III. Kerületi TVE as a playing assistant coach. In the summer 2021 it was confirmed, that Czvitkovics would continue his playing career at Unione FC alongside his coaching duties at Kerületi.

Career statistics

National team
Czvitkovics made his debut on 10 October 2006 in Valletta against Malta.

(Statistics correct as of 16 August 2009)

International matches

Honours

Club
MTK Hungária FC
Nemzeti Bajnokság I: 1998–99, 2002–03
Hungarian Cup: 1999–00
Hungarian Super Cup: 2003
Debreceni VSC
Nemzeti Bajnokság I: 2008–09, 2009–10
Hungarian Cup: 2007–08, 2009–10, 2012–13
Hungarian Super Cup: 2009, 2010
Hungarian League Cup: 2010

Individual
Nemzeti Sport Team of the Season (5):  2007–08, 2008–09, 2009–10, 2010–11 Autumn Season, 2010–11
Zilahi Prize: 2010

References

External links
 Profile at magyarfutball.hu
 Profile 
 
 

1983 births
Living people
Sportspeople from Székesfehérvár
Hungarian footballers
Hungary international footballers
Association football midfielders
Serbs of Hungary
Fehérvár FC players
MTK Budapest FC players
Debreceni VSC players
K.V. Kortrijk players
Puskás Akadémia FC players
Vasas SC players
BFC Siófok players
Budaörsi SC footballers
III. Kerületi TUE footballers
Nemzeti Bajnokság I players
Belgian Pro League players
Hungarian expatriate footballers
Expatriate footballers in Belgium
Hungarian expatriate sportspeople in Belgium